Helios Bars were smart bicycle handlebars which integrated GPS tracking, Bluetooth connectivity, and rear LEDs that function like turn signals on a car. The device was made by Helios Biking, a hardware start-up based in San Francisco, California.

The handlebars can be remotely controlled via a smartphone app when connected to a Bluetooth Low Energy (4.0) enabled smartphone. This allows them to be switched between a visual speedometer mode where the rear LEDs change color based on your speed, and a turn-by-turn navigation mode where the rear LEDs guide you to a destination by blinking left or right when a turn is approaching. Additionally, turn signals, or "blinkers," can be activated by pressing a tactile button on either side of the stem.

Development
The design for Helios Bars started with a concept by Kenneth Gibbs illustrating a set of handlebars that contained integrated lighting. Gibbs pitched the idea to his college roommates, Antonio Belmontes and Seena Zandipour, who helped him refine the concept and start prototyping. Together they founded Helios Biking and successfully took their idea through the HAXLR8R hardware start-up incubator based out of Shenzhen, China. Being in Shenzhen allowed them to rapidly iterate between prototypes & complete their R&D in just under 4 months. According to Helios co-founder Seena Zandipour, "We underestimated ourselves. Within the first week, we had the prototype completed."

Funding
Gibbs and the Helios team launched a Kickstarter campaign on May 21, 2013 with an initial fundraising target of $70,000. Backers spending $199 would receive a set of Helios Bars when they became available ($149 for the first 100). In less than a week of going live, the project had met the $70,000 goal.

As of June 2017, many of the original Kickstarter supporters and virtually all of their retail customers have failed to receive their Helios Bars, even though Helios continues to take new orders on their website. Their website was downgraded to a basic version, with email responses gone unanswered for two years.

As of July 2020, the Helios website is no longer active.

See also
 Ambient intelligence

References

External links
 Official website
 Kickstarter Campaign for Helios Bars

Science and technology in the San Francisco Bay Area